Clackmannan and Kennet railway station served the town of Clackmannan, Clackmannanshire from 1893 to 1930 on the Kincardine Line.

History 
The station opened on 18 December 1893 by the North British Railway. To the southeast was the goods yard. The station closed on 7 July 1930.

References

External links 

Disused railway stations in Clackmannanshire
Railway stations in Great Britain opened in 1893
Railway stations in Great Britain closed in 1930
Former North British Railway stations
1893 establishments in Scotland
1930 disestablishments in Scotland